Mariana Duque and Julia Glushko were the defending champions, but both players chose not to participate.

Demi Schuurs and Renata Voráčová won the title, defeating Nicola Geuer and Viktorija Golubic in the final, 6–1, 6–2.

Seeds

Draw

References 
 Draw

Open Engie Saint-Gaudens Midi-Pyrenees - Doubles